Holt County is a county in the U.S. state of Nebraska. As of the 2020 census, the population was 10,127. Its county seat is O'Neill.

Holt County is in the Outback area of Nebraska.

In the Nebraska license plate system, Holt County is represented by the prefix 36 (it had the 36th-largest number of vehicles registered in the county when the license plate system was established in 1922).

History
Holt County was created by an act of the Nebraska Territory Legislature in 1862, and was organized in 1876. It is named for Joseph Holt of Kentucky, who was postmaster general and secretary of war under President James Buchanan. It shares its name with Holt County, Missouri, though it is named for a different Holt.

Geography
The terrain of Holt County consists of low, rolling hills, with the flattened areas used for agriculture. The Niobrara River flows eastward along the north line of the county, and the Elkhorn River flows southeastward through the upper central portion of the county. It is Nebraska's fifth-largest county by area.

Major highways

  U.S. Highway 20
  U.S. Highway 275
  U.S. Highway 281
  Nebraska Highway 11
  Nebraska Highway 95

Adjacent counties

 Antelope County - east
 Boyd County - north 
 Knox County - east
 Wheeler County - south
 Garfield County - south
 Loup County - southwest
 Rock County - west
 Keya Paha County - northwest

Demographics

As of the 2000 United States Census, 11,551 people, 4,608 households, and 3,170 families were residing in the county. The population density was 5 people/sq mi (2/km2). The 5,281 housing units averaged 2/sq mi (1/km2). The racial makeup of the county was 98.86% White, 0.03% African American, 0.29% Native American, 0.18% Asian, 0.05% Pacific Islander, 0.23% from other races, and 0.35% from two or more races. About 0.71% of the population was Hispanic or Latino of any race. By ancestry, 46.0% were  German, 12.5% Irish, 8.6% American, 7.5% English, and 5.4% Czech.

Of the 4,608 households, 31.6% had children under 18 living with them, 60.7% were married couples living together, 5.6% had a female householder with no husband present, and 31.2% were not families. About 28.7% of all households were made up of individuals, and 15.1% had someone living alone who was 65  or older. The average household size was 2.46, and the average family size was 3.06.

The county's age distribution was 27.30% under 18, 5.70% from 18 to 24, 24.50% from 25 to 44, 22.70% from 45 to 64, and 19.80% who were 65 or older. The median age was 40 years. For every 100 females there were 96.90 males. For every 100 females age 18 and over, there were 93.50 males.

The median income for a household in the county was $30,738, and for a family was $37,463. Males had a median income of $24,681 versus $17,593 for females. The per capita income for the county was $15,256. About 9.8% of families and 13.0% of the population were below the poverty line, including 15.0% of those under age 18 and 12.1% of those age 65 or over.

Communities

Cities
 Atkinson
 O'Neill (county seat)

Villages

 Chambers
 Emmet
 Ewing
 Inman
 Page
 Stuart

Unincorporated communities

 Amelia
 Anncar
 Catalpa
 Deloit
 Dorsey
 Dustin
 Inez
 Meek
 Opportunity
 Paddock
 Redbird
 Stafford
 Star

Townships

 Antelope
 Atkinson
 Belle
 Chambers
 Cleveland
 Coleman
 Conley
 Deloit
 Dustin
 Emmet
 Ewing
 Fairview
 Francis
 Golden
 Grattan
 Green Valley
 Holt Creek
 Inman
 Iowa
 Josie
 Lake
 McClure
 Paddock
 Pleasant View
 Rock Falls
 Sand Creek
 Saratoga
 Scott
 Shamrock
 Sheridan
 Shields
 Steel Creek
 Stuart
 Swan
 Verdigris
 Willowdale
 Wyoming

Politics
Holt County voters have historically tended to vote Republican. In only two elections since 1916 has the county selected the Democratic Party candidate.

See also
 National Register of Historic Places listings in Holt County, Nebraska

References

External links
 Official website

 
Nebraska counties
1876 establishments in Nebraska
Populated places established in 1876